Samantha Joy Mostyn  (born 1964 or 1965, known as Sam Mostyn) is an Australian businesswoman and climate change and gender equity advocate, and first woman AFL commissioner. As of 2021 Mostyn is president at Chief Executive Women. She is a board member on numerous boards, including the Climate Council, the GO Foundation, Mirvac, Transurban, Virgin Australia and The Sydney Swans. The Mostyn medal, for "best and fairest" women in AFL, is named after her.

Early life and career 
Mostyn was born about 1965 and grew up within the army, being the daughter of an army colonel. She is married with one daughter. One of Mostyn's earliest positions was working with Michael Kirby, within the NSW Court of Appeal. She was subsequently a communications advisor to the office of Prime Minister Paul Keating.

Mostyn holds a BA/LLB from the Australian National University (ANU). In 2018 she was awarded an Honorary Doctorate of Laws, from ANU. She was an advisor to Bob Collins, as well as Michael Lee, and the former Prime Minister, Paul Keating. Mostyn is also the Deputy chair of the Diversity Council of Australia.

Mostyn contributed to the development of the AFL’s Respect and Responsibility Policy, and also led to the establishment of the Australian Football League Women (AFWL). She is an advocate of women’s issues and supporting domestic violence survivors.

Media 
Mostyn has written for, and been quoted in, the media regularly. She spoke at the National Press Club, in November 2021, as president of the Chief Executive Women. She delivered a speech on economic recovery and post-pandemic recovery, describing how Australia can make "the most of its available resources and talent", by investing in care, for paid parental leave, childhood education and superannuation reform, as well as ensuring employees in the care industry, such as teachers, childcare workers and nurses, are receiving well-paid salaries, and respect within the workplace.

"The pandemic has left women exhausted and deepened their inequality, particularly in the workplace. For too long, the uncelebrated driving force behind our luck has been underpaid, or unpaid, women."

Mostyn has also advocated for Domestic Violence, and First Nations women. She has been in the media, describing "the Great Exhaustion" following the Covid pandemic unpaid, extra roles of women in parenting and the workforce. She commenting that the election in 2022 will be a gendered issue, signing an open letter staying that widespread reform is needed to assist the return to the workplace, for Australian women.

Mostyn was a panellist on the Q+A TV show, when audience members asked whether Prime Minister Scott Morrison's support for women "was genuine", following marches in early 2021. Mostyn commented that recommendations by Kate Jenkins, Sex Discrimination Commissioner, following the national inquiry into workplace sexual harassment, could be implemented and accepted. Media commentary resulted when another male on the panel interrupted Mostyn, on the topic of men listening to women, multiple times.

Mostyn has reported on corporate Australia and the gender diversity within the top 300 companies, with 5% of women CEOs in the S&P ASX200 companies. She has also commented on how quotas for gender equity in the workplace work, and how quotas within the AFL have led to improvements in the AFL and the AFLW.

Mostyn has commented that a large number of woman leaders "sends a message to everybody that women are equal and improves overall culture". She has stated that when a significant proportion of women are on boards, issues including as domestic violence policy, sexual harassment complaints, are brought to attention. She has also written in the Sydney Morning Herald about women and the economy.

Climate change work 
Mostyn was one of the Australia 2020 Summit participants. She is a chair of the Climate Council and has written about bushfires and climate change for the Climate Council. In a 2021 event on climate leadership prior to Glasgow 2021, Mostyn interviewed Professor Lesley Hughes. She is a board member of Climate Works, and was the winner of the IGCC Climate awards in 2019. Her Doctor of Laws was awarded in recognition of her leadership climate change work.

Prizes and awards

References

External links 
 ANU alumni awards
Women in Climate Change 2021

Living people
Australian women business executives
21st-century Australian businesswomen
21st-century Australian businesspeople
Officers of the Order of Australia
Year of birth missing (living people)
1960s births